The 1948 NCAA Tennis Championships were the 3rd annual tournaments to determine the national champions of NCAA men's singles, doubles, and team collegiate tennis in the United States.

The team championship was won by defending champions William & Mary, their second team national title. The Indians finished one point ahead of San Francisco (6–5) and Harry Likas at UCLA In Los Angeles.

Host site
This year's tournaments were hosted by UCLA in Los Angeles, California.

Team scoring
Until 1977, the men's team championship was determined by points awarded based on individual performances in the singles and doubles events.

References

External links
List of NCAA Men's Tennis Champions

NCAA Division I tennis championships
NCAA Division I Tennis Championships
NCAA Division I Tennis Championships